This is a list of high schools in the U.S. state of South Carolina.

Abbeville County

Abbeville High School, Abbeville
Calhoun Falls Charter School, Calhoun Falls
Dixie High School, Due West

Aiken County

Midland Valley High School, Graniteville
Ridge Spring-Monetta High School, Monetta
Wagener-Salley High School, Wagener

Aiken

Aiken High School
Mead Hall Episcopal School
Silver Bluff High School
South Aiken Baptist Christian School
South Aiken High School
Town Creek Christian Academy

North Augusta

North Augusta High School
Victory Christian School

Allendale County
Allendale-Fairfax High School, Fairfax

Anderson County

Belton-Honea Path High School, Honea Path
Crescent High School, Iva
Palmetto High School, Williamston
Pendleton High School, Pendleton
Powdersville High School, Powdersville
Wren High School, Piedmont

Anderson

Anderson Christian School
Montessori School of Anderson
New Covenant Christian School
Oakwood Christian School
T L Hanna High School
Temple Christian Academy
Westside High School

Bamberg County

Bamberg-Ehrhardt High School, Bamberg
Denmark-Olar High School, Denmark

Barnwell County

Barnwell High School, Barnwell
Blackville-Hilda High School, Blackville
Williston-Elko High School, Williston

Beaufort County

Beaufort Academy, Lady's Island
St. John Paul II Catholic School (South Carolina), Okatie

Beaufort

Battery Creek High School
Beaufort High School
Bridges Preparatory School
Lowcountry Montessori School
Whale Branch Early College High School

Bluffton

Bluffton High School
Hilton Head Christian Academy
May River High School

Hilton Head

Hilton Head Island High School
Hilton Head Preparatory School

Berkeley County

Berkeley High School, Moncks Corner
Bishop England High School, Charleston
Cane Bay High School, Summerville
Cross High School, Cross
Hanahan High School, Hanahan
Timberland High School, St. Stephen

Goose Creek

Goose Creek High School
Stratford High School

Calhoun County

St. Matthews

Calhoun Academy
Calhoun County High School

Charleston County

Charleston

Allegro Charter School of Music
Ashley Hall
Burke High School
Charleston Advancement Academy
Charleston Charter School for Math and Science
First Baptist School
James Island Charter High School
James Island Christian School
Learn4Life High School
Porter-Gaud School
Septima P. Clark Alternative Academy
West Ashley High School

Hollywood

Baptist Hill High School
Lowcountry Leadership Charter School

Johns Island

Charleston Collegiate School
St. John's High School

Mount Pleasant

Lucy Garrett Beckham High School
Oceanside Collegiate Academy
University School of the Lowcountry
Wando High School

North Charleston

Academic Magnet High School
Charleston County School of the Arts
Greg Mathis Charter High School
Liberty Hill Academy
Lowcountry Acceleration Academy
Military Magnet Academy
North Charleston High School
Northside Christian School
Palmetto Scholars Academy
R.B. Stall High School

Cherokee County
Blacksburg High School, Blacksburg

Gaffney

Gaffney High School
Heritage Christian Academy

Chester County

Chester Senior High School, Chester
Great Falls High School, Great Falls
Lewisville High School, Richburg

Chesterfield County

Central High School, Pageland
Cheraw High School, Cheraw
Chesterfield High School, Chesterfield
McBee High School, McBee

Clarendon County
East Clarendon High School, Tuberville

Manning

Laurence Manning Academy
Manning High School

Summerton

Clarendon Hall School
Scott's Branch High School

Colleton County

Walterboro

Colleton County High School
Colleton Preparatory Academy

Darlington County
Lamar High School (South Carolina), Lamar

Darlington

Darlington High School
Mayo High School for Math, Science, and Technology

Hartsville

Emmanuel Christian School
Hartsville High School
South Carolina Governor's School for Science and Mathematics

Dillon County

Lake View High School, Lake View
Latta High School, Latta

Dillon

Dillon Christian School
Dillon High School

Dorchester County
Woodland High School, Dorchester

North Charleston

Cathedral Academy
Fort Dorchester High School

Summerville

Ashley Ridge High School
Pinewood Preparatory School
Summerville High School

Edgefield County

Fox Creek High School, North Augusta
Strom Thurmond High School, Johnston

Fairfield County

Winnsboro

Fairfield Central High School
Richard Winn Academy

Florence County

Hannah-Pamplico High School, Pamplico
Johnsonville High School, Johnsonville
Timmonsville High School, Timmonsville
Trinity Collegiate School, Darlington

Florence

Florence Christian School
South Florence High School
The King's Academy
Maranatha Christian School
West Florence High School
Wilson High School

Lake City

The Carolina Academy
Lake City High School

Georgetown County

Andrews High School, Andrews
Carvers Bay High School, Hemingway
Georgetown High School, Georgetown
Waccamaw High School, Pawleys Island

Greenville County

Mauldin High School, Mauldin
Travelers Rest High School, Travelers Rest

Fountain Inn

Fountain Inn Christian School
Fountain Inn High School

Greenville

Berea High School
Carolina High School & Academy
Christ Church Episcopal School
The Fine Arts Center
First Presbyterian Academy
GREEN Upstate High School
Greenville High School
Greenville Technical Charter High School
Hampton Park Christian School
J. L. Mann High School
Legacy Early College
South Carolina Governor's School for the Arts & Humanities
Southside High School
St. Joseph's Catholic School
Tabernacle Christian School
Wade Hampton High School

Greer

Blue Ridge High School
Calvary Christian School
Greer High School
Riverside High School

Piedmont

Piedmont Christian School
Woodmont High School

Simpsonville

Brashier Middle College Charter High School
Greenville Classical Academy
Hillcrest High School
Southside Christian School

Taylors

Eastside High School
Greer Middle College Charter High School

Greenwood County

Ninety-Six High School, Ninety-Six
Ware Shoals High School, Ware Shoals

Greenwood

Cambridge Academy
Emerald High School
Greenwood Christian School
Greenwood High School
Palmetto Christian Academy

Hampton County
Wade Hampton High School, Varnville

Estill

Estill High School
Patrick Henry Academy

Horry County

Aynor High School, Aynor
Green Sea-Floyds High School, Green Sea
Loris High School, Loris
North Myrtle Beach Christian School, Longs
North Myrtle Beach High School, Little River
St. James High School, Burgess

Conway

Academy for Technology & Academics
Conway High School
Scholars Academy

Myrtle Beach

Academy for the Arts, Science and Technology
Carolina Forest High School
Christian Academy of Myrtle Beach
Coastal Leadership Academy
Myrtle Beach High School
Risen Christ Christian Academy
St. Elizabeth Ann Seton Catholic High School
Socastee High School
Valorous Academy

Jasper County

Ridgeland

Ridgeland-Hardeeville High School
Polaris Tech Charter School
Thomas Heyward Academy

Kershaw County 

Lugoff-Elgin High School, Lugoff
North Central High School, Kershaw

Camden

Camden High School
Camden Military Academy

Lancaster County

Andrew Jackson High School, Kershaw
Indian Land High School, Fort Mill

Lancaster

Buford High School
Lancaster High School

Laurens County
Clinton High School, Clinton

Laurens

Laurens Academy
Laurens District 55 High School

Lee County

Bishopville

Lee Central High School
Lee Academy
Pee Dee Math, Science, and Technology Academy

Lexington County

Airport High School, West Columbia
Batesburg-Leesville High School, Batesburg
Brookland-Cayce High School, Cayce
Chapin High School, Chapin
Gilbert High School, Gilbert
Pelion High School, Pelion
Swansea High School, Swansea

Irmo

Dutch Fork High School
Irmo High School

Lexington

Lexington High School
River Bluff High School
White Knoll High School

Marion County

Marion High School, Marion
Mullins High School, Mullins

Marlboro County

Bennettsville

Marlboro Academy
Marlboro County High School

McCormick County

McCormick

SC Governor's Agriculture School at John de la Howe
McCormick High School

Newberry County

Mid-Carolina High School, Prosperity
Whitmire Community School, Whitmire

Newberry

Newberry Academy
Newberry High School

Oconee County

Walhalla High School, Walhalla
West-Oak High School, Westminster

Seneca

Oconee Christian Academy
Seneca Senior High School

Orangeburg County

Bethune-Bowman Middle/High School, Rowesville
Branchville High School, Branchville
Edisto High School, Cordova
Hunter-Kinard-Tyler High School, Norway
Lake Marion High School & Technology Center, Santee
North High School, North

Orangeburg

Orangeburg Preparatory Schools
Orangeburg-Wilkinson Senior High School

Pickens County

D. W. Daniel High School, Central
Liberty High School, Liberty

Easley

Easley Christian School
Easley High School

Pickens

Lakeview Christian School
Pickens High School

Richland County
Lower Richland High School, Hopkins

Blythewood

Blythewood High School
Westwood High School

Columbia

Public

A.C. Flora High School
C.A. Johnson High School
Columbia High School
Dreher High School
Midlands Arts Conservatory
Midlands Middle College
Eau Claire High School
Richland Northeast High School
Ridge View High School
Spring Valley High School
W.J. Keenan High School

Private

Ben Lippen School
Cardinal Newman High School
Covenant Classical Christian School
Grace Christian School
Hammond School
Heathwood Hall Episcopal School
Northside Christian Academy

Saluda County
Saluda High School, Saluda

Spartanburg County

Boiling Springs High School, Boiling Springs
Woodruff High School, Woodruff
Chesnee High School, Chesnee
Chapman High School, Inman
James F. Byrnes High School, Duncan
Landrum High School, Landrum
Dorman High School, Roebuck

Spartanburg

Broome High School
High Point Academy
Oakbrook Preparatory School
South Carolina School for the Deaf and Blind
Spartanburg Christian Academy
Spartanburg Day School
Spartanburg High School
Spartanburg Preparatory School
Westgate Christian School

Sumter County
Thomas Sumter Academy, Rembert

Sumter

Crestwood High School
Lakewood High School
St Francis Xavier High School
Sumter Christian School
Sumter High School
Wilson Hall

Union County
Union County High School, Union

Williamsburg County
Hemingway High School, Hemingway

Kingstree

Kingstree Senior High School
Williamsburg Academy

York County 
Clover High School, Clover

Fort Mill

Fort Mill High School
Nation Ford High School

Rock Hill

Northwestern High School
Riverwalk Academy
Rock Hill High School
St. Anne's Catholic High School
South Pointe High School
Westminster Catawba Christian School

York

York Comprehensive High School
York Preparatory Academy

See also 
List of school districts in South Carolina

External links 
List of high schools in South Carolina from SchoolTree.org

South Carolina
High